Etienne Soukkarie, even Stephen Sukkariyeh or Etienne Soukharyé (born on 17 October 1868 in Damascus, Syria - died on 25 November 1921) was Patriarchal Vicar of the Patriarchal Vicariate of Egypt and Sudan.

Life

Etienne Soukkarie in 1891 was ordained to the priesthood. On April 25, 1920, he was simultaneously appointed Titular Archbishop of Myra of Greek Melkites and Patriarchal Vicar of Alexandria. Soukkarie was the successor to the Auxiliary Bishop Pierre-Macario Saba (1903-1919). The Patriarch of Antioch Archbishop Demetrios I Qadi consecrated him bishop on the same day. His co-consecrators were Archbishop Nicolas Cadi of Bosra and Hauran and Archbishop Maximos IV Sayegh of Tyre. He was succeeded by Antonio Farage.

References

External links
 http://www.catholic-hierarchy.org/bishop/bsouk.html

1868 births
1921 deaths
Melkite Greek Catholic bishops
Syrian archbishops
Syrian Melkite Greek Catholics
People from Damascus